Georgina Andrews is an Australian actress best known for her recurring role as Heather Pryor in the television soap opera Neighbours. She plays a leading role in the feature film The Sculptor.

External links
 

Living people
Year of birth missing (living people)
Place of birth missing (living people)
21st-century Australian actresses
Australian soap opera actresses
Australian film actresses